Abdulla Al-Salem is an area of Kuwait City. It is known to be one of the areas where the wealthiest of the families of Kuwait live alongside Faiha, Shuwaikh, Nuzha, Kaifan, and Shamiyah. Lands in this area range from 750 to 1250 square meters and the average of a 1000 sq meter land is worth between 1 and 2 million Kuwaitii Dinars (about 3.3 to 6.6 million dollars).

Demographics
According to the public Authority for civil information there are 22,429 residents. 51.44% are Kuwaiti, 42.65% Asians, 4.45% other Arabs, 1.16% Africans, 0.20% North Americans, and 0.09% Europeans.

Location 

Abdulla Al-Salem is located in a strategic area between the first and second ring roads. It is adjacent to Kuwait City. A drive to the city would be 5-10 minutes. Abdulla Al-Salem is located east of Shamiyah and west of Mansouriah.

Blocks 

The area is divided into four blocks. Block 1, the largest by area, is located to the north. Block 2, 3, and 4 are located to the south of block one and are situated from west to east in the order of Block 4, Block 3, Block 2.

References 

Suburbs of Kuwait City
Populated places in Kuwait